Peppino Spadaro (1898-1950) was an Italian actor. His brother Umberto Spadaro was also an actor.

Selected filmography
 1860 (1934)
 Saint John, the Beheaded (1940)
 Jealousy (1942)
 The Taming of the Shrew (1942)
 Music on the Run (1943)
 Farewell Love! (1943)
 Lively Teresa (1943)
 L'abito nero da sposa (1945)
 Romulus and the Sabines (1945)
 The Street Has Many Dreams (1948)
 Margaret of Cortona (1950)
 Night Taxi (1950)
 Terra senza tempo (1950)
 Cavalcade of Heroes (1950)
 Ring Around the Clock (1950)

References

Bibliography
 Ann C. Paietta. Saints, Clergy and Other Religious Figures on Film and Television, 1895–2003. McFarland, 2005.

External links

1898 births
1950 deaths
Italian male stage actors
Italian male film actors
Actors from Sicily